Lithophane querquera, the shivering pinion, is a species of cutworm or dart moth in the family Noctuidae. It is found in North America.

The MONA or Hodges number for Lithophane querquera is 9904.

References

Further reading

 
 
 

querquera
Articles created by Qbugbot
Moths described in 1874